Yusseli Guadalupe Mendivil Soto (born 6 September 1991) is a Mexican racing cyclist, who last rode for American amateur team . Mendivil has also competed for UCI Women's Team  in 2017. She rode in the women's road race at the 2016 UCI Road World Championships, finishing in 21st place. In 2011, she finished fourth at the Vuelta Femenina a Guatemala, and finished third at the Tour of America's Dairyland in 2015.

References

External links
 
 

1991 births
Living people
Mexican female cyclists
Place of birth missing (living people)
21st-century Mexican women
20th-century Mexican women